Franklin Christenson "Chris" Ware (born December 28, 1967) is an American cartoonist known for his Acme Novelty Library series (begun 1994) and the graphic novels Jimmy Corrigan, the Smartest Kid on Earth (2000), Building Stories (2012) and Rusty Brown (2019). His works explore themes of social isolation, emotional torment and depression. He tends to use a vivid color palette and realistic, meticulous detail. His lettering and images are often elaborate and sometimes evoke the ragtime era or another early 20th-century American design style.

Ware often refers to himself in the publicity for his work in self-effacing, even withering tones. He is considered by some critics and fellow notable illustrators and writers, such as Dave Eggers, to be among the best currently working in the medium; Canadian graphic-novelist Seth has said, "Chris really changed the playing field. After him, a lot of [cartoonists] really started to scramble and go, 'Holy [expletive], I think I have to try harder.'"

Career
Born in Omaha, Nebraska, Ware resides in the Chicago area of Illinois. His earliest published strips appeared in the late 1980s on the comics page of The Daily Texan, the student newspaper of the University of Texas at Austin. In addition to numerous daily strips under different titles, Ware also had a weekly satirical science fiction serial in the paper titled Floyd Farland: Citizen of the Future. This was eventually published in 1988 as a prestige format comic book from Eclipse Comics, and its publication even led to a brief correspondence between Ware and Timothy Leary.

While still a sophomore at UT, Ware came to the attention of Art Spiegelman, who invited Ware to contribute to Raw, the influential anthology magazine Spiegelman was co-editing with Françoise Mouly. Ware has acknowledged that being included in Raw gave him confidence and inspired him to explore printing techniques and self-publishing. His Fantagraphics series Acme Novelty Library defied comics publishing conventions with every issue. The series featured a combination of new material as well as reprints of work Ware had done for the Texan (such as Quimby the Mouse) and the Chicago weekly paper Newcity. Ware's work appeared originally in Newcity before he moved on to his current "home", the Chicago Reader. Beginning with the 16th issue of Acme Novelty Library, Ware began self-publishing his work, while maintaining a relationship with Fantagraphics for distribution and storage. This was a return to Ware's early career, self-publishing such books as Lonely Comics and Stories as well as miniature digests of stories based on Quimby the Mouse and an unnamed potato-like creature.

In recent years he has also been involved in editing (and designing) several books and book series, including the new reprint series of Gasoline Alley from Drawn & Quarterly titled Walt and Skeezix; a reprint series of Krazy Kat by Fantagraphics; and the 13th volume of Timothy McSweeney's Quarterly Concern, which is devoted to comics. He was the editor of The Best American Comics 2007, the second installment devoted to comics in the Best American series.

In 2007, Ware curated an exhibition for the Phoenix Art Museum focused on the non-comic work of five contemporary cartoonists. The exhibition, titled "UnInked: Paintings, Sculpture and Graphic Works by Five Cartoonists", ran from April 21 through August 19. Ware also edited and designed the catalog for the exhibition.

In 2017, Ware's book Monograph appeared. It is a part-memoir, part-scrapbook retrospective of his career to that point.

Style
Ware's art reflects early 20th-century American styles of cartooning and graphic design, shifting through formats from traditional comic panels to faux advertisements and cut-out toys. Stylistic influences include advertising graphics from that same era; newspaper strip cartoonists Winsor McCay (Little Nemo in Slumberland) and Frank King (Gasoline Alley); Charles Schulz's post-WWII strip Peanuts and the cover designs of ragtime-era sheet music. Ware has spoken about finding inspiration in the work of artist Joseph Cornell and cites Richard McGuire's strip Here as a major influence on his use of non-linear narratives. Ware has said of his own style:I arrived at my way of "working" as a way of visually approximating what I feel the tone of fiction to be in prose versus the tone one might use to write biography; I would never do a biographical story using the deliberately synthetic way of cartooning I use to write fiction. I try to use the rules of typography to govern the way that I "draw", which keeps me at a sensible distance from the story as well as being a visual analog to the way we remember and conceptualize the world. I figured out this way of working by learning from and looking at artists I admired and whom I thought came closest to getting at what seemed to me to be the "essence" of comics, which is fundamentally the weird process of reading pictures, not just looking at them. I see the black outlines of cartoons as visual approximations of the way we remember general ideas, and I try to use naturalistic color underneath them to simultaneously suggest a perceptual experience, which I think is more or less the way we actually experience the world as adults; we don't really "see" anymore after a certain age, we spend our time naming and categorizing and identifying and figuring how everything all fits together. Unfortunately, as a result, I guess sometimes readers get a chilled or antiseptic sensation from it, which is certainly not intentional, and is something I admit as a failure, but is also something I can't completely change at the moment.

Although his precise, geometrical layouts may appear to some to be computer-generated, Ware works almost exclusively with manual drawing tools such as paper and ink, rulers and T-squares. He does, however, sometimes use photocopies and transparencies, and he employs a computer to color his strips.

Recurring characters and stories

Quimby the Mouse
Quimby the Mouse was an early character for Ware and something of a breakthrough. Rendered in the style of an early animation character like Felix the Cat, Quimby the Mouse is perhaps Ware's most autobiographical character. Quimby's relationship with a cat head named Sparky is by turns conflict-ridden and loving, and thus intended to reflect all human relationships. While Quimby exhibits mobility, Sparky remains immobile and helpless, subject to all the indignities Quimby visits upon him. Quimby also acts as a narrator for Ware's reminiscences of his youth, in particular his relationship with his grandmother. Sometimes illustrated as a two-headed mouse, Quimby embodies both Ware and his grandmother, and the duality of a young and old body. Quimby was presented in a series of smaller panels than most comics, almost providing the illusion of motion à la a zoetrope. In fact, Ware once designed a zoetrope to be cut out and constructed by the reader in order to watch a Quimby "silent movie". Ware's ingenuity is neatly shown in this willingness to break from the confines of the page.  Quimby the Mouse appears in the logo of a Chicago-based bookstore "Quimby's", although their shared name was originally a coincidence.

Rusty Brown
Ware's Rusty Brown focuses on the titular character, examining his life in the present and through flashbacks of his childhood, focusing on his arrested development and attachment to cultural objects. As the story expands, it diverges into multiple storylines about Brown's father's early life in the 1950s as a science fiction writer (Acme Novelty Library #19) and his best friend Chalky White's adult home life. The first part of Rusty Brown was published in book form in 2019 by Pantheon Books.

Building Stories
Ware's Building Stories was serialized in a host of different venues. It first appeared as a monthly strip in Nest Magazine. Installments later appeared in a number of publications, including The New Yorker, Kramer's Ergot, and most notably, the Sunday New York Times Magazine. Building Stories appeared weekly in the New York Times Magazine from September 18, 2005 until April 16, 2006. A full chapter was published in Acme Novelty Library, number 18. Another installment was published under the title "Touch Sensitive" as a digital app released through McSweeneys. The entire narrative was published as a boxed set of books by Pantheon in October 2012. The boxed set holds 14 different works, in various sizes and forms, weaving through the life of an unnamed brown haired woman.

The Last Saturday
Ware's latest project, The Last Saturday, a "comic novella," began appearing online every Friday at the website of the UK newspaper The Guardian, starting in September 2014. The story follows a few people in Sandy Port, Michigan: Putnam Gray, a young boy caught up in his sci-fi and space fantasies; Sandy Grains, a young girl and classmate who is interested in Putnam; Rosie Gentry, a young girl and classmate with whom Putnam is infatuated; Mr. and Mrs. Gray and Mrs. Grains. The strip also features in the newspaper's Weekend magazine.

The serialization has now apparently ended after 54 instalments. The bottom right-hand corner of the last page has a note that says, "END, PART ONE", but , there appears to be no indication from The Guardian or from Ware that there is to be a Part Two.

Non-comics work
Ware is an ardent collector of ragtime paraphernalia and occasionally publishes a journal devoted to the music titled The Ragtime Ephemeralist. He also plays the banjo and piano. The influence of the music and the graphics of its era can be seen in Ware's work, especially in regard to logos and layout. Ware has designed album covers and posters for such ragtime performers as the Et Cetera String Band, Virginia Tichenor, Reginald R. Robinson, the Paragon Ragtime Orchestra and Guido Nielsen. 

He has also designed covers and posters for non-ragtime performers such as Andrew Bird's Bowl of Fire and 5ive Style. In October 2005 Ware designed the elaborate cover art for Penguin Books' new edition of Voltaire's Candide.

Ware was commissioned by Chip Kidd to design the inner machinations of the bird on the cover of Haruki Murakami's novel The Wind-Up Bird Chronicle.

In 2003-04, Ware worked with Ira Glass of This American Life and Chicago historian Tim Samuelson to illustrate and design Lost Buildings about Samuelson and the preservation of Chicago's old buildings, particularly Louis Sullivan's buildings. Originally produced for a live "Lost in America" stage show in 2003, Lost Buildings was later published as a book and DVD. In 2007-08, he produced animations for the This American Life television series on Showtime and also contributed to the show as a color consultant. Ware created poster art for Tamara Jenkins' 2007 film The Savages and her 2018 film Private Life.

Mural for 826 Valencia
Dave Eggers commissioned Ware to design the mural for the facade of San Francisco literacy project 826 Valencia. The mural depicts "the parallel development of humans and their efforts at and motivations for communication, spoken and written." The 3.9m x 6m mural was applied by artisans to Ware’s specifications. Describing the work, Ware said "I didn’t want it to make anyone 'feel good', especially in that typically muralistic 'hands across the water' sort of way,"..."I especially wanted it to be something that people living in the neighbourhood could look at day after day and hopefully not tire of too quickly. I really hoped whomever might happen to come across it would find something that showed a respect for their intelligence, and didn’t force-feed them any 'message'."

Fortune 500 cover
In 2010, Ware designed the cover for Fortune magazine's "Fortune 500" issue, but it was rejected. Ware had mentioned the work at a panel at the Chicago Comic and Entertainment Expo on April 16, as first noted in an April 20 blog post by Matthew J. Brady. The cover, featuring the circle-shaped humans common in Ware's more broadly socially satirical comic-strips, turned the numbers 500 into skyscrapers looming over the continental United States. On the roofs, corporate bosses drink, dance, and sun themselves as a helicopter drops a shovelful of money down for them. Below, among signs reading "Credit Default Swap Flea Market," "Greenspan Lube Pro," and "401K Cemetery," a helicopter scoops money out of the US Treasury with a shovel, cars pile up in Detroit, and flag-waving citizens party around a boiling tea kettle in the shape of an elephant. In the Gulf of Mexico, homes are sinking, while hooded prisoners sit in Guantanamo, a "Factory of Exploitation" keeps going in Mexico, China is tossing American dollars into the Pacific, and the roof of bankrupted Greece's Treasury has blown off. A spokesperson for the magazine only said that, as is their practice, they had commissioned a number of possible covers from different artists, including Ware. Brady wrote in his blog that Ware said at the panel he "accepted the job because it would be like doing the [cover for the] 1929 issue of the magazine".

Uncle Boonmee Who Can Recall His Past Lives
In 2011, Ware created the poster for the U.S. release of the 2010 film Uncle Boonmee Who Can Recall His Past Lives by Thai director Apichatpong Weerasethakul. Describing the poster, Ware said "I wanted to get at both the transcendent solemnity of the film while keeping some sense of its loose, very unpretentious accessibility... This being a poster, however—and even worse, me not really being a designer—I realized it also had to be somewhat punchy and strange, so as to draw viewers in and pique their curiosity without, hopefully, insulting their intelligence."

Awards and honors
Over the years his work garnered several awards, including the 1999 National Cartoonists Society's Award for Best Comic Book for Acme Novelty Library and Award for Graphic Novel for Building Stories.

Ware has won numerous Eisner Awards during his career including Best Artist/Writer in 2009 (Acme Novelty Library) and 2013 (Building Stories); Best Artist/Writer-Drama in 2008; Best Continuing Series in 1996 and 2000 (Acme Novelty Library); Best Graphic Album: New in 2000 and 2013 (Building Stories); Best Graphic Album: Reprint in 2001 (Jimmy Corrigan); Best Colorist of 1996, 1998, 2001 and 2006; Best Publication Design in 1995, 1996, 1997 (Acme Novelty Library), 2001 (Jimmy Corrigan), 2002, 2006 (Acme Novelty Library Annual Report for Shareholders) and 2013 (Building Stories)

Ware has won multiple Harvey Awards including Best Continuing or Limited Series in 2000 and 2001; Best Cartoonist in 2006 (Acme Novelty Library); Best Letterer in 1996, 2000, 2002, and 2006 ; Best Colorist in 1996, 1997, 1998, 2000, 2002 and 2004 (Acme Novelty Datebook); and Special Award for Excellence in Presentation in 1996, 1997, 1998, 1999, 2000 (Acme Novelty Library), 2001 (Jimmy Corrigan), 2004 (Acme Novelty Datebook) and 2013 (Building Stories)

In 2002, Ware became the first comics artist to be invited to exhibit at Whitney Museum of American Art biennial exhibition. With Will Eisner, Jack Kirby, Harvey Kurtzman, Robert Crumb and Gary Panter, Ware was among the artists honored in the exhibition "Masters of American Comics" at the Jewish Museum in New York City, New York, from September 16, 2006 to January 28, 2007. His work was the subject of solo exhibitions at the Museum of Contemporary Art, Chicago in 2006 and at the University of Nebraska's Sheldon Museum of Art, in 2007.

Ware's graphic novel Jimmy Corrigan, the Smartest Kid on Earth won the 2001 Guardian First Book Award, the first time a graphic novel has won a major United Kingdom book award. It also won the prize for best album at the 2003 Angoulême International Comics Festival in France.

In 2006, Ware received a USA Hoi Fellow grant from United States Artists.

In 2013, Ware received the 2013 Lynd Ward Graphic Novel Prize for Building Stories and was finalist for Jan Michalski Prize for Literature and Los Angeles Times Book Prize.

In 2020, Ware's Rusty Brown was nominated for the PEN/Jean Stein Book Award.

In 2021, he was awarded the Grand Prix de la ville d'Angoulême for his lifelong achievement.

Bibliography

 
 
 
Acme Novelty Datebook. Drawn & Quarterly. 2007. .
Jordan Wellington Lint. Drawn & Quarterly. 2010. .
 
The Acme Novelty Datebook: Sketches and Diary Pages in Facsimile. Drawn & Quarterly. 2013.

References

Sources

"The Art of Melancholy". The Guardian, October 31, 2005
Arnold, Andrew. "The Depressing Joy of Chris Ware." Time, November 27, 2001.

Onstad, Chris. "Visual Tribute to Chris Ware". Achewood, January 11, 2008.
Peters, Tim. "Chris Ware's ANL #20". The Point, Spring 2011.

Schjeldahl, Peter. "Words and Pictures: Graphic novels come of age". The New Yorker, October 17, 2005.
Wolk, Douglas. "The inimitable Chris Ware". Salon.com, September 2, 2005.
Wondrich, David. "Ragtime: No Longer a Novelty in Sepia", The New York Times, January 21, 2001.

External links

Acme Novelty Archive: Unofficial database of the works of Ware
Stripped Books: A Comics Panel – comics-form adaptation of a panel featuring Chris Ware, Seth and moderator Ivan Brunetti
Interview and evaluation of Ware by designer Chip Kidd
Chris Ware's mural for 826 Valencia's facade
The Last Saturday. A comic novella posted in weekly instalments on the website of UK newspaper The Guardian

1967 births
Alternative cartoonists
American graphic novelists
Artists from Nebraska
American comic strip cartoonists
Eisner Award winners for Best Coloring
Eisner Award winners for Best Letterer/Lettering
Eisner Award winners for Best Writer/Artist
Harvey Award winners for Best Cartoonist
Harvey Award winners for Best Colorist
Living people
Artists from Oak Park, Illinois
University of Texas at Austin alumni
Writers from Nebraska
American male novelists
The New Yorker cartoonists
American Book Award winners
Skowhegan School of Painting and Sculpture alumni
Grand Prix de la ville d'Angoulême winners
Inkpot Award winners